Vokes is a surname. Notable people with the surname include:
 Christopher Vokes (1904-1985), Canadian Army officer
 Ed Vokes (1908-1967), Canadian ice hockey player
 Emily H. Vokes (born 1930), American malacologist and paleontologist
 Harold Vokes (1908-1998), American malacologist and paleontologist
 Leroy H. Vokes (1849-1924), American soldier
 May Vokes (1882-1957), American actress
 Sam Vokes (born 1989), Welsh footballer
 Vokes family of actors:-
Fawdon Vokes (born Walter Fawdon; 1844–1904), actor
Fred Vokes (1846–1888), actor and dancer
Jessie Vokes (1848–1884), actress and dancer
Rosina Vokes (1854–1894), actress

See also
 Voke (disambiguation)